The 1997 Saskatchewan Scott Tournament of Hearts women's provincial curling championship, was held January 22–26 at the Swift Current Arena in Swift Current, Saskatchewan. The winning team of Sandra Schmirler, represented Saskatchewan at the 1997 Scott Tournament of Hearts in Vancouver, British Columbia, where the team finished round robin with a 9-2 record, and would go on to defeat Ontario's Alison Goring, in both the 1-2 Game and the Final, to win the Canadian Championship.

Teams

 Renelle Bryden
 Pam Haupstein
 Kim Hodson
 Sherry Linton
 Myrna Nielson
 Sherry Scheirich
 Sandra Schmirler
 Anita Silvernagle

Standings

Results

Draw 1
January 22, 7:30 PM CT

Draw 2
January 23, 10:00 AM CT

Draw 3
January 23, 2:30 PM CT

Draw 4
January 24, 10:00 AM CT

Draw 5
January 24, 2:30 PM CT

Draw 6
January 24, 7:30 PM CT

Draw 7
January 27, 7:00 PM CT

Playoffs

Semifinal
January 25, 7:30 PM CT

Final
January 29, 5:00 PM CT

References

Curling in Saskatchewan
Swift Current
Saskatchewan Scott Tournament of Hearts
Scott Tournament of Hearts
Saskatchewan Scott Tournament of Hearts
Scotties Tournament of Hearts provincial tournaments